Jimy Stiven Heredia (born 15 April 1996, in Lima) is a Peruvian volleyball and beach volleyball player who represented his country at the beach volleyball tournament of the 2014 Summer Youth Olympics in Nanjing, China.

Heredia currently plays the South American Beach Volleyball Circuit.

Results
Summer Youth Olympics
2014: 17th

References

External links
 
 
 

1997 births
Living people
Peruvian beach volleyball players
Beach volleyball players at the 2014 Summer Youth Olympics